George Washington Carver High School is a public high school in Montgomery, Alabama.  It is a part of the Montgomery Public Schools system. The groundbreaking for a new Carver High School was held April 2, 2008 at the construction site just off Oak Street across from the existing school. Its design utilizes modern advances in architecture, construction and technology. The $36 million school is the first of six new schools scheduled in the first phase of the MPS building program. The Carver High School ribbon cutting ceremony was held in August 2010 with the school serving approximately 1,200 students.

Carver serves residents of the main section of Maxwell Air Force Base.

History
George Washington Carver High School began in September 1948 as a vocational school to a majority black community.  Clarence M. Dannelly, then superintendent of Montgomery Public Schools, held the ground breaking ceremony on Fairview Avenue on April 13, 1948.

The school opened on January 4, 1949. At that time there were 24 classrooms, an office suite, and a lunchroom which also served as an auditorium. There were 875 students and 23 faculty members including principal, M. H. Griffin, a graduate of the University of Michigan. This connection is why Carver High School adopted the wolverine as its mascot. The curriculum consisted of the basic subjects and physical education.

In subsequent years, Carver was expanded both physically and academically. Eight classrooms were added from 1951–1952. An elementary unit, consisting of 20 rooms and a gymnasium were added from 1952−1953. By 1959, the enrollment had increased to nearly 1,700 students and an 18-room extension was added. This extension consisted of science labs, home-making rooms, mechanic shops and workshops.

In 1982, the Carver Creative and Performing Arts Center (CCPAC) was created.

Athletics
In 1964, Carver won the negro AAA (the largest division at the time) state football championship in 1964 with a record of 9-0-1, defeating Cobb Avenue of Anniston.

Carver won the 4A state championship in both 1978 and 1979. Carver High School won the Class 6A Basketball state championship title for 2012 and 2015. It also earned a regional title in 2009.

Notable alumni
 Willie Alexander, NFL player
 Caesar Belser, NFL player
 Tom Boswell, former National Basketball Association player
 Byron Braggs, NFL player
 Milford Brown, NFL player
 Aundray Bruce, former NFL linebacker
 Oscar Gamble, former MLB player
 Shaun Dion Hamilton, NFL player
 Terry Hardy, NFL player
 Jeremy Johnson, college quarterback
 Merlakia Jones, former Women's National Basketball Association player
 Chris Relf, American football quarterback
 Fernandus Vinson, NFL player
 Mack Wilson, NFL player
 Melvin Tyus Jr., football player at Troy University
 Shaun Dion Hamilton, NFL player

See also
Booker T. Washington School (Montgomery, Alabama)

References

External links

High schools in Montgomery, Alabama
Public high schools in Alabama
1945 establishments in Alabama
Educational institutions established in 1945
Historically segregated African-American schools in Alabama